On Saturday, November 11, 1911, a cold snap, known as the Great Blue Norther or 11/11/11, affected the Central United States. Many cities broke record highs, going into the 70s and 80s early that afternoon. By nightfall, cities were dealing with temperatures in the teens and single-digits on the Fahrenheit scale. This is the only day in many midwest cities' weather bureau jurisdictions where the record highs and lows were broken for the same day. Some cities experienced tornadoes on Saturday and a blizzard on Sunday. A blizzard even occurred within one hour after an F4 tornado hit Rock County, Wisconsin.

The front produced severe weather and tornadoes across the upper Mississippi Valley, a blizzard in Ohio, and the windy conditions upon front passage caused a dust storm in Oklahoma. Alongside the dramatic temperature swings, the cold front brought a destructive tornado outbreak to parts of the Midwest. At least 12 tornadoes touched down across five states as the system moved through, resulting in 13 fatalities. Hundreds of structures were destroyed by the storms and many areas had to conduct search and rescue missions amidst blizzard conditions. According to Thomas P. Grazulis, this outbreak was one of the worst on record in November for the north-central States.

Background
The main cause of such a dramatic cold snap was an extremely strong storm system separating warm, humid air from frigid, arctic air. Dramatic cold snaps tend to occur mostly in the month of November, though they can also come in February or March.  These arrivals of Continental Polar or Arctic air masses are generally called northers, and the one in question was marked by a mass of steel blue clouds in the vicinity of the surface front, hence the name.  Although temperature drops of this extent have happened on other occasions, as recently as February 2009, the fact that the 1911 cold front passage was during the autumn and came after such warm weather contributed to the properties mentioned in this article.

Impact
The cold front was so strong, that while several states saw record monthly highs on November 10 and 11, they saw record cold monthly lows on November 12 and 13. The cold front began on November 9.

As the cold front approached, the winds increased turning from southeast to northwest. In Springfield, the temperature difference was even more extreme. CST (21:45 UTC), before the cold front moved through. By 7:00 p.m. It was  the first time since records had been kept for Springfield when the record high and record low were broken in the same day. The freak temperature difference was also a record breaker: 67°F (37°C) in 10 hours. Peak wind gusts reached . Both records still hold. It also produced a dust storm. In Chicago, Illinois, people died separately of heatstroke and cold, respectively, within 24 hours, the first such incidence on record in the city.

However, the record low for November 13 was broken in 2019. Temperature plunges ranged from 42°F to 54°F (23°C to 30°C) on the East Coast. Besides the East Coast, San Antonio was also spared, with a temperature drop of only 35°F (19°C).

Tornadoes

On Saturday, November 11, 1911, a regionally and seasonally significant tornado outbreak affected the Great Lakes region of the United States. The outbreak generated at least 13 tornadoes, including a violent, long-tracked F4 that impacted Wisconsin, killing at least nine people and injuring 50 more. Other intense tornadoes occurred in Illinois and Indiana, resulting in four additional fatalities. Several other tornadoes were reported from multiple states. In all, the outbreak killed 16 people and injured at least 101. Total losses exceeded $1.755 million (1911 USD). Tornado researcher Thomas P. Grazulis considered the outbreak to be the worst in the month of November on record at the time in the Great Lakes region.

Some cities experienced tornadoes on Saturday and a blizzard on Sunday. The passage of a cold front, marked by strong winds, produced severe weather, including tornadoes, across the upper Mississippi River Valley, a blizzard in Ohio, and a dust storm in Oklahoma.

Confirmed tornadoes

A possible tornado caused extensive damage in Bedford, Lawrence County, Indiana, with losses reaching $500,000. Another possible tornado killed horses and cattle near Kingsland in Eaton County, Michigan. At least three other tornadoes may have affected Green, Dane, and Walworth counties, respectively, in the state of Wisconsin.

See also
List of tornadoes and tornado outbreaks
List of North American tornadoes and tornado outbreaks
Twosday
Tornado outbreak of November 17, 2013 – Deadliest and costliest November outbreak on record in Illinois and the largest for that month on record in Indiana

Notes

References

Sources

 

Cold waves in the United States
1911 natural disasters in the United States
1911 cold waves
November 1911 events